Gigalum Island or Gigalum is a tiny, private uninhabited island off the southeast coast of Gigha in Scotland.

Gigalum has a modern house in the middle, and gives its name to the strait between it and the main island, "Caolas Gigalum". It is also flanked by another islet, "Eilean na h-Uilinn", literally "Island of the Elbow".

References

External links

Uninhabited islands of Argyll and Bute